Razzall is a surname. Notable people with the surname include:

Humphrey Razzall (1912–1999), British politician and solicitor
Katie Razzall (born 1970), British journalist
Tim Razzall, Baron Razzall (born 1943), British politician